Wildlife Prairie Park, also known as the Hazel & Bill Rutherford Wildlife Prairie Park, is located in Peoria County, Illinois, approximately 10 miles (16 km) west of downtown Peoria in central Illinois. Opened in the 1970s, it has most recently been operated as a not-for-profit corporation since 2013. The park has  of land with over 150 animals of 60 different species that are native to Illinois.

History 
Local philanthropist and attorney Bill Rutherford Sr. and his wife Hazel founded Wildlife Prairie Park. The Forest Park Foundation first acquired the area in the late 1960s. The foundation had originally intended to use the land as a breeding farm for endangered species in partnership with the Brookfield Zoo and the Chicago Zoological Society. However, the zoo's plans changed. The Forest Park Foundation pivoted to create a zoological park that would preserve the native plants and animals of Illinois.

Wildlife Prairie Park initially welcomed visitors in September 1977 for six weeks in honor of Hazel Rutherford's birthday. The park officially opened to the public on August 4, 1978.

On September 5, 2000, Bill Rutherford Sr. presented the deed to the park to Governor George Ryan and the park was transferred from private foundation ownership to the Illinois Department of Natural Resources and renamed Hazel & Bill Rutherford Wildlife Prairie State Park. Although owned by the state, the Forest Park Foundation continued to manage the park operations under a contract with the Illinois Department of Natural Resources.

Wildlife Prairie Park struggled to receive funding from the state. The Forest Park Foundation agreed to turn over operational responsibility to a new governing board, a group of locals known as Friends of Wildlife Prairie Park.

In May 2013, the park was officially transferred back into private ownership when it was given to the Friends of Wildlife Prairie Park.

Flora and fauna 
Some of the wildlife includes white bison, wolves, waterfowl, black bears, elk, otters, badgers, snakes, bobcats, butterflies, and other native animals.

Recreation 
Fishing, riding the train, camping, hiking, biking, kayaking, and other activities are available in the park. 

The Prairie Zephyr Train is a one-third scale train with over a mile of track. There are 2 locomotives, a "steam" locomotive powered by a Caterpillar Diesel engine, and a "diesel" locomotive powered by a Chevy Cobalt gasoline engine. The train has 2 freight cars and 9 passenger cars. Five of these passenger cars were built by Chance Rides out of Wichita, Kansas and were previously used at the St. Louis Zoo. Four passenger cars were built by Sandley Light Railway Equipment Works of Wisconsin Dells, Wisconsin, and were acquired from the Milwaukee County Zoo. The train offers rides to guests during fair weather.

Many of the park's artificial elements were constructed by hand and with recycled materials in an effort to reduce their negative environmental effects years before it was commonplace to safeguard the environment.

Photo gallery

References

External links

Wildlife Prairie Park — official website

1977 establishments in Illinois
Protected areas of Peoria County, Illinois
Protected areas established in 1977
State parks of Illinois
Wildlife parks